John Severn Bednarski (born July 4, 1952) is a Canadian former ice hockey defenceman, who played in the National Hockey League (NHL) for the New York Rangers and the Edmonton Oilers between 1974 and 1979.

Bednarski was born in Thunder Bay, Ontario. An alumnus of the Manitoba Junior Hockey League, he signed with the Rangers as a free agent in 1972 and began play in the American Hockey League (AHL) with the Rochester Americans. He made his NHL debut in 1974 with the Rangers, playing a total of 99 games over three seasons, and scored two goals and 18 assists. In 1977, he returned to the minor leagues before signing with the Oilers for their first year in the NHL, playing only one game before being sent back down to the minors.

He later signed a contract with the Buffalo Sabres but never played another NHL game. He eventually became the radio and TV analyst for the Americans for many years before resigning prior to the 2005–06 season. In 2007, Bednarski was inducted into the Americans Hall of Fame.

Career statistics

Regular season and playoffs

References

External links
 

1952 births
Living people
Canadian ice hockey defencemen
Cincinnati Stingers (CHL) players
Edmonton Oilers players
Erie Blades players
Ice hockey people from Ontario
Kildonan North Stars players
New Haven Nighthawks players
New York Rangers players
Providence Reds players
Rochester Americans players
Sportspeople from Thunder Bay
Undrafted National Hockey League players
Winnipeg Jets (WHL) players